Seven Kings railway station is on the Great Eastern Main Line serving the district of Seven Kings in the London Borough of Redbridge, east London. Its three-letter station code is SVK and it is in Travelcard Zone 4.

The station was opened on 1 March 1899 by the Great Eastern Railway.

History
Seven Kings station was opened on 1 March 1899. Seven Kings West Junction (used for freight, excursion and empty stock traffic) was closed in 1956, though the other connection, from Ilford, was severed as early as 1947 due to the expansion of the Ilford sheds, which are visible from the western end of Seven Kings' platforms. The carriage sheds comprise a large depot which includes two workshops.

Accidents and incidents
On 23 January 1963, eight people were injured in a collision between two trains on the main line just outside of Seven Kings station. An express train from Harwich Parkeston Quay to London passed a signal at danger and ran into the rear of a Southend-London stopping service at "fairly low speed". The express train was subsequently found to have a fault with one of its brakes. A Ministry of Transport report on the incident stated that the express train's driver "cannot be excused entirely from responsibility" given his passing of the red signal. The line was reopened four hours after the incident.

Elizabeth line
In June 2017 new  trains began entering service in preparation for the opening of Crossrail. New lifts, signage, help points, customer information screens and CCTV were installed.

Services
The typical off-peak service is eight trains per hour in each direction between Paddington and Shenfield (on Sundays four of the eight trains terminate instead at Gidea Park).

During peak times service frequency is increased. In addition, there is one early-morning service operated by Abellio Greater Anglia; from Colchester to Liverpool Street.

Connections
London Buses routes 86 and N86 serve the station.

References

External links

 Excel file displaying National Rail station usage information for 2005/06 

Railway stations in the London Borough of Redbridge
Former Great Eastern Railway stations
Railway stations in Great Britain opened in 1899
Railway stations served by the Elizabeth line
Railway stations